Crisilla aartseni is a species of minute sea snail, a marine gastropod mollusk or micromollusk in the family Rissoidae.

Description
Shell color ranges from creamy white to a dark brown, often with splotched patterning. Its average size is about 1.5 millimeters.

Distribution
It is most commonly founds around the southern Spanish coast, near the Gibraltar strait and the Alboran Sea.

References

 Verduin A. (1984). On the taxonomy of some recent European marine species of the genus Cingula s.l.. Basteria 48: 37-87
 Oliver J.D., Templado J. & Kersting D. 2012. Gasterópodos marinos de las islas Columbretes (Mediterráneo occidental). Iberus, 30(2): 49-87

External links
 

Rissoidae
Gastropods described in 1984